The TL-Ultralight Stream is a Czech ultralight aircraft, designed and produced by TL-Ultralight of Hradec Králové, introduced at the AERO Friedrichshafen show in 2013.

Design and development
The Stream is the company's fastest design to date. It was designed to comply with the Fédération Aéronautique Internationale microlight rules. It features a cantilever low-wing, an enclosed cockpit with two-seats-in-tandem under a bubble canopy, retractable tricycle landing gear and a single engine in tractor configuration.

The aircraft is made from composite materials. Its  span wing mounts flaps. Standard engines available are the  Rotax 912ULS and 912iS, and the turbocharged  Rotax 914 four-stroke powerplants, driving a three-bladed PowerMax propeller.

Operational history
Reviewer Marino Boric described the design in a 2015 review as "very sleek" and added that it "should give the pilot the feeling of piloting a jet-fighter."

Specifications (Stream)

References

External links

TL Ultralight aircraft
2010s Czech ultralight aircraft
Single-engined tractor aircraft